Karagwe Kingdom is in north-western Tanzania between Rwanda and Lake Victoria. Karagwe Kingdom was influential  kingdom  in the history of East Africa led by a hereditary of Kings and  chief said to have descended from the Bachwezi. It enjoyed prosperous trade with merchants from all corners of Africa including Arabs towards the end of the 20th century.

History

The Karagwe kingdom was part of the many Great Lakes Kingdoms in East Africa. The kingdom reached its apex during the 19th century. The growth occurred during the early part of the 1800s with King Ndagara who came to power around 1820 and ruled until 1853 at which time he was replaced by King Rumanika.

Economy

During the height of the Karagwe kingdom agriculture played an important role in local economics. Many Karagwe were cattle herders and so cows were a measure of wealth and power.

Iron production also played a key part in the economic balances within the kingdom. The location of Karagwe land in what is today north-western Tanzania allowed them to participate in regional trade routes that connected Buganda and other the Ugandan and Rwandan states and merchants from the Eastern coast and the rest of eastern Africa.

Banyambo people
The Banyambo are an ethnic group in Tanzania. They primarily inhabit the Kagera and Kigoma regions in the north west. The Banyambo are pastoralists. They are considered to be distinct from the Haya people. This distinction is said to be based on cultural differences, with the Haya economy predominantly oriented toward fishing and agriculture, and the Banyambo predominantly engaged in pastoralism.

Art
The most famous works of art from the Karagwe kingdom are iron objects. Some are utilitarian, while others are thought to be symbolic cows and hammers which were used symbolically to link the king with iron production.

Royal House 
Karagwe was ruled by a line of Kings said to have descended from the Bachwezi and Babiito clans. The kingdom is said to have been established by Ruhinda, a son of Njunaki, son of Igaba, grandson of Wamalaa.

References

See also
List of kings of Karagwe

Karagwe
Precolonial Tanzania
Former countries in Africa